Thomas Lepeltier (born 4 January 1967) is a French independent scholar, essayist and science writer specializing in the history and philosophy of science and applied ethics, known in particular for his contributions to the field of animal law. He is the author of several philosophical works on animal ethics such as L'imposture intellectuelle des carnivores ("The Intellectual Deception of Carnivores") and of science history books including Darwin hérétique ("Darwin Heretic") and Univers parallèles ("Parallel Universes"). Known initially as a science historian, he now mainly advocates in defense of animals in the French media.

Life and work 
Thomas Lepeltier was born on 4 January 1967. Following the completion of a PhD in astrophysics in 1994, Lepeltier taught in Newcastle, Toulouse, and Paris, he focused his research on the history and philosophy of science. He later discovered animal ethics and developed an interest in veganism after reading Charles Patterson's Eternal Treblinka. Lepeltier published La Révolution végétarienne ("The Vegetarian Revolution") in 2013, in which he explores the history of slavery abolition and argues that the "struggle for veganism will eventually succeed as the struggle against human slavery did". He became an Associate Fellow of the Oxford Centre for Animal Ethics in 2019.

Lepeltier has been called upon to debate animal ethics several times on French television, radio and forums. Lepeltier is also the author of several works attempting to deconstruct the discourses justifying the use of animals, he mobilizes on these occasions a wide variety of arguments from the three major currents of normative ethics, whether it is a question of recalling the definition of speciesism according to Peter Singer, that the theories of the social contract do not impose (like babies) to be able to respect duties in order to have rights, or that it is cruel to deprive animals of their lives for the personal pleasure gained by eating them.

Lepeltier is also a regular contributor to the French popular science magazines La Recherche and Sciences Humaines and is an editor of and writer for the French-language antispeciesist journal L'Amorce ("The Primer").

Philosophy 
Lepeltier's philosophy is antispeciesist; he considers that the species to which a living being belongs is not in itself a relevant criterion of moral consideration and that in particular, the mere fact of belonging to a particular species cannot in itself justify that an animal can be killed to, for example, serve as a meal.

Particularly interested in the analysis of the speeches of French-speaking intellectuals, Lepeltier considers that "most say or even write anything to justify their consumption of meat, eggs and dairy products" and that "unfortunately, in a media world complacent, no one denounces this bad faith of professionals, this silence of politicians and this ineptitude of intellectuals". He has sometimes been criticised for his condemnation of all breeding (without distinction between industrial and non-industrial varieties) and his use of analogies with human slavery or The Holocaust.

Lepeltier has distinguished himself within the French animalist movement, as a defender of interventionism in favor of reducing the suffering of wild animals. He believes that our lack of responsibility for the fate of wild animals should not make us indifferent to their fate; we should, he says, worry about wild animals and think of solutions to alleviate their suffering. Lepeltier has also engaged with the predation problem, arguing that predation is something that humans should work towards preventing.

Publications

As author 

 Les véganes vont-ils prendre le pouvoir?, Éditions du Pommier, 2019.
 L'imposture intellectuelle des carnivores, Max Milo, 2017.
 La Face cachée de l'Univers. Une autre histoire de la cosmologie, Seuil, 2014.
 La Révolution végétarienne, Éditions Sciences Humaines, 2013.
 Univers parallèles, Seuil, 2010.
 Vive le créationnisme! Point de vue d'un évolutionniste, L'Aube, 2009.
 Darwin hérétique: L'éternel retour du créationnisme, Seuil, 2007.

As co-author 

 Les Grands penseurs de l'éducation, Éditions Sciences Humaines, 2018.
 La Philosophie, un art de vivre, Éditions Sciences Humaines, 2017.
 Les grands mythes, Éditions Sciences Humaines, 2017.
 Les religions: Des origines au IIIe millénaire, Éditions Sciences Humaines, 2017.
 Peter Singer et La libération animale, Pur, 2017.
 Révolutions animales, Les Liens qui Libèrent, 2016.
 Masculin-Féminin-Pluriel, Éditions Sciences Humaines, 2014.
 Creationism in Europe, Johns Hopkins, 2014.
 Le sexe d'hier à aujourd'hui, Éditions Sciences Humaines, 2013.
 Philosophie: Auteurs et Thèmes, Éditions Sciences Humaines, 2012.
 Cinq siècles de pensée française, Éditions Sciences Humaines, 2010.
 La bibliothèque idéale des sciences humaines, Éditions Sciences Humaines, 2008.
 Le tout et les parties dans les systèmes naturels, Vuibert, 2007.
 La Religion: Unité et diversité, Éditions Sciences Humaines, 2007.

As editor 

 La Révolution antispéciste, Puf, 2018.
 Histoire et philosophie des sciences, Éditions Sciences Humaines, 2013.
 Un autre cosmos?, Vuibert, 2012.

References

External links 
 

1967 births
Living people
21st-century French essayists
21st-century French writers
Animal ethicists
French animal rights scholars
French ethicists
French scholars
French veganism activists
Historians of science